This is a list of Members of Parliament (MPs) elected to the House of Commons of the United Kingdom by Northern Irish constituencies for the 56th Parliament of the United Kingdom (2015 to 2017). There are 18 such constituencies, 11 of which are represented by Unionists and seven by Nationalists. It includes both MPs elected at the 2015 general election, held on 7 May 2015, and those subsequently elected in by-elections.

The list is sorted by the name of the MP, and MPs who did not serve throughout the Parliament are italicised. New MPs elected since the general election are noted at the bottom of the page.

Sinn Féin MPs follow an abstentionist policy of not taking their seats in the House of Commons.

Current composition

MPs

See also
 2015 United Kingdom general election
 List of MPs elected in the 2015 United Kingdom general election
 List of MPs for constituencies in England 2015–17
 List of MPs for constituencies in Scotland 2015–17
 List of MPs for constituencies in Wales 2015–17
 :Category:UK MPs 2015–2017

References

Northern Ireland
2015-17
MPs
2010s elections in Northern Ireland